John Denoil Johnson (November 28, 1909 – October 27, 1978) was a professional American football player who played offensive tackle for seven seasons for the Detroit Lions. He was inducted into the Utah Sports Hall of Fame in 1970.

He was born to Alex and Mary Alice Johnson in Grantsville, Utah. The Johnson home was built in 1899 in the Queen Anne style. A photograph of the house was featured on the cover of Utah's Historic Architecture, 1847-1940 by Thomas Carter and Peter Goss, University of Utah Press, Salt Lake City, Utah.

1909 births
1978 deaths
People from Grantsville, Utah
Players of American football from Utah
American football offensive tackles
Utah Utes football players
Detroit Lions players